Empalme (municipality) is a municipality in Sonora in north-western Mexico. As of 2015, the municipality had a total population of 56,177.

References

Municipalities of Sonora